Margh Malek (also Romanized as Margh-e Malek; also known as Margheh Malek, Margh-ī-Malīk, and Morq Malek) is a village in Margh Malek Rural District of Laran District, Shahrekord County, Chaharmahal and Bakhtiari province, Iran. At the 2006 census, its population was 2,236 in 564 households. The following census in 2011 counted 1,982 people in 586 households. The latest census in 2016 showed a population of 1,729 people in 547 households; it was the largest village in its rural district. The village is populated by Turkic people.

References 

Shahrekord County

Populated places in Chaharmahal and Bakhtiari Province

Populated places in Shahr-e Kord County